Edouard Grethen (17 June 1903 – 2 April 1981) was a Luxembourgian gymnast. He competed in seven events at the 1928 Summer Olympics.

References

1903 births
1981 deaths
Luxembourgian male artistic gymnasts
Olympic gymnasts of Luxembourg
Gymnasts at the 1928 Summer Olympics
Sportspeople from Luxembourg City
20th-century Luxembourgian people